Walter Taieb (born February 13, 1973 in Paris, France) is a French record producer, songwriter, composer and conductor.

Career
In the mid-1990s, Taieb was a member of the house music group the Original, which scored a hit single in 1995 with "I Luv U Baby".

Taieb is the composer of The Alchemist's Symphony with Juilliard professor Philip Lasser (1997). He studied conducting with Rolf Reuter in Berlin.

References

1973 births
Musicians from Paris
French male composers
French male conductors (music)
Living people
21st-century French conductors (music)
21st-century French male musicians